Guler may refer to:
 Guler State, a former princely state in India
 Guler paintings
 Haripur Guler, a town in India, former capital of Guler State 
 Guler, a former parliamentary constituency in Himachal Pradesh, now Jawali, Himachal Pradesh
 Güler (disambiguation), a Turkish name